Arata Sonoda (born 5 July 1994) is a Japanese Greco-Roman wrestler. He won one of the bronze medals in the 130 kg event at the 2018 Asian Games held in Jakarta, Indonesia.

Career 

In 2014, he competed in the 130 kg event at the World Wrestling Championships where he was eliminated in his first match by Bilyal Makhov of Russia. The following year, he competed again in the 130 kg event with the same result; he was eliminated from the competition in his first match, this time against Lukas Hörmann.

In 2017, he competed in the 130 kg event at the World Wrestling Championships held in Paris, France where he lost his only match against Levan Arabuli. In 2018, he was also eliminated in his first match and the same thing happened in the 130 kg event in 2019.

In 2020, he competed at the 2020 Asian Wrestling Championships held in New Delhi, India where he lost his bronze medal match against Mansur Shadukayev. In April 2021, he competed at the Asian Olympic Qualification Tournament hoping to qualify for the 2020 Summer Olympics in Tokyo, Japan. He did not qualify at this tournament and, in May 2021, he also failed to qualify for the Olympics at the World Olympic Qualification Tournament held in Sofia, Bulgaria.

He competed in the 130kg event at the 2022 World Wrestling Championships held in Belgrade, Serbia.

Achievements

References

External links 

 

Living people
1994 births
Place of birth missing (living people)
Japanese male sport wrestlers
Wrestlers at the 2018 Asian Games
Asian Games medalists in wrestling
Asian Games bronze medalists for Japan
Medalists at the 2018 Asian Games
20th-century Japanese people
21st-century Japanese people